Lipson Island Conservation Park is a protected area in the Australian state of South Australia associated with Lipson Island in Spencer Gulf about  north northeast of Lipson.

The land which now comprises the conservation park previously received statutory protection in March 1967 as a fauna conservation reserve declared under the Crown Lands Act 1929-1966 and was re-proclaimed in 1972 under the National Parks and Wildlife Act 1972 as a conservation park.

The area under protection is considered significant for the following reason: ‘a small island supporting breeding colonies of fairy penguins, black-faced cormorants, sooty oystercatchers, crested terns, pacific gulls and silver gulls.’

The conservation park is classified as an IUCN Category III protected area.

References

External links
Lipson Island Conservation Park webpage on protected planet

Conservation parks of South Australia
South Australian terrestrial protected areas with a marine zone
Protected areas established in 1967
1967 establishments in Australia
Spencer Gulf
Penguin colonies